The 2009 KHL Junior Draft was the first entry draft held by the Kontinental Hockey League (KHL), taking place on June 1, 2009. Twenty-three teams would take part in the draft, selecting ice hockey players from around the world aged between 17 and 21 years of age. The draft acted as a means to disperse junior players among Russia, as well as create parity for recruiting from non-KHL affiliated hockey schools.

Although the inaugural KHL season had 24 teams, Khimik Voskrensk was forced to drop out of league activities due to financial constrains. Avtomobilist Yekaterinburg filled this vacancy, however. HC MVD did not make a single selection in the draft, refusing to use any of their draft picks.

Mikhail Pashnin, a defenceman from HC Mechel, was the first overall selection, chosen by CSKA Moscow.

Format
The order of the draft was determined through an inversion of the 2009 KHL standings, with the exception of Avtomobilist, which selected last. Teams participating were able to select any player not protected by, or playing for a KHL team, aged 17–21. Rights obtained via the draft terminate when a player turns 22 years of age.

Eligibility
The following players were eligible to be drafted:
Graduates of non-KHL affiliated hockey schools
KHL-affiliated hockey school graduates not already on RUS-Jr rosters
Players aged 17–21, not under contract with a KHL team.

Teams may protect up to 15 players currently in their organization from being exposed to the draft. This does not apply to players already signed to a two-way contract with a KHL team.

Draft-day trades

Selections by round

Round one

Round two 
== KHL All-Star·

Round three

Round four

See also
2009–10 KHL season
2009 NHL Entry Draft

References

External links
Official KHL Entry Draft Selections
Protected players
Draft listings

Kontinental Hockey League Junior Draft
Junior Draft